The Supreme Council of the Armed Forces (SCAF; , , also Higher Council of the Armed Forces) is a statutory body of between 20 and 25 senior Egyptian military officers and is headed by Field Marshal Abdul Fatah al-Sisi and Lieutenant General Mohamed Ahmed Zaki. The council is convened only in cases of war or great internal emergencies. As a consequence of the Egyptian Revolution of 2011, SCAF assumed power to govern Egypt from departing President Hosni Mubarak on 11 February 2011, and relinquished power on 30 June 2012 upon the start of Mohamed Morsi's term as president. The Council has met regularly in times of national emergencies. During the course of the 2011 revolution, the Supreme Council of the Armed Forces met first on 9 February 2011 under the chairmanship of Egyptian president, Hosni Mubarak. The Council met for the first time without the chairmanship of the president on the following day, 10 February, and issued their first press statement which signaled that the council was about to assume power which they did the following day after Mubarak's resignation. The military junta was headed by Field Marshal Mohamed Hussein Tantawi who served as the Minister of Defense under Mubarak, and included the service heads and other senior commanders of the Egyptian Armed Forces, namely Lt. Gen. Sami Hafez Anan, Armed Forces Chief of Staff; Air Marshal Reda Mahmoud Hafez Mohamed, Air Force commander; Lt. Gen. Abd El Aziz Seif-Eldeen, Commander of Air Defense; and Vice Admiral Mohab Mamish, Navy Commander in Chief.

History

The SCAF has its origins in the Free officers' movement, a clandestine body of anti-British Egyptian military officers in the late 1940s that seized power in a coup-cum-revolution in 1952. The officers organised themselves into the Revolutionary Command Council, which ruled Egypt as a junta until 1954, when a new Constitution was introduced, and a cabinet-style government was formed. The Revolutionary Council was dissolved by the dictator-turned President Gamal Abdel Nasser, who formed the Supreme Council of the Armed Forces in December 1954, as a statutory government body, comprising 25 senior-most military officers from the Army, Navy, Air Force and Air Defence Forces, with himself as the chairman of the body. The statute ruled that the council could not convene without the presence and approval of the President as the permanent Chairman. The initiative for a meeting could only be started either by the President or the Defence Minister. Nasser intended to form this body mainly as a concession to the Army which had controlled Egypt through the Revolutionary Command Council since 1952. The SCAF was mandated to decide policy on all matters it deemed falling under the purview of "National Security". Thus, in Egypt the SCAF or more correctly the Air Force still handles the issuance of aviation licenses to private individuals and companies who want to operate any airborne vehicle in the country. Similarly, all private Radio station licenses are issued by the Army, while spectrum sale for mobile telephony are issued by the Egyptian Air Defence Forces. For building hotels and resorts along beaches and coastal areas, investors need permission from the Navy. The idea of such a body of military officers guiding matters of State security probably came to nationalist officers through the Prussian and German Supreme War Council during the First World War. However the scope of SCAF's licensing powers during peacetime allows it to wield wide economic and political influence.

The SCAF convened numerous times in 1956 during the Suez Crisis, during the Yemeni Civil War between 1964 and 1967, and throughout the period 1967 to 1974. Between 1967 and 1974, SCAF was composed of almost 25 senior officers, and totally controlled and planned Egypt's military policy vis-a-vis Israel. After 1974 the SCAF went into semi-permanent dormancy, until it was revived in 1981 after the assassination of President Anwar Sadat.

Actions

Prior to Mubarak's resignation
The Supreme Council released its first statement on Thursday, 10 February 2011, stating that the council "in affirmation and support for the legitimate demands of the people" is in "continuous session  to consider what procedures and measures that may be taken to protect the nation". It was noted that then-president Hosni Mubarak was not present in the meeting as the Supreme Commander of the Armed Forces, however the meeting was headed by Defense Minister Field Marshal Mohamed Hussein Tantawi.

Assuming power
The Supreme Council of the Armed Forces in its third statement issued on the evening of Friday, 11 February 2011, shortly after the announcement of Mubarak's resignation, stated that the Council is not a substitute for the legitimacy that satisfies the people. The Council addressed "with all the greetings and cherished for the lives of the martyrs who sacrificed their lives to sacrifice for freedom and security of their country, "and led a spokesman for the Council to salute the martyrs, an action which received wide appraise from the people. The Council also thanked President Hosni Mubarak "for his work in the process of national war and in peace and on the national position in preference to the higher interest of the homeland" in the same statement. In the following day, 12 February, the Council released his fourth statement, which he pledged to oversee the transition to ensure the transfer of power to a civilian government elected by the people.

Transition period and political reforms
In its statement the Council indicated that it intends to suspend emergency laws that had been in effect for three decades, and move towards free and fair presidential elections, and provide for a safe transition to a free democratic order. One of their first actions was to dissolve the Parliament of Egypt, suspend the Constitution of Egypt, and an announcement of free, open presidential and parliamentary elections before the year's end and within six months. However, they have not yet lifted the emergency law and has failed to live up to is promises of civilian transfer of power and implementing the demands of the revolution.

The Council has also declared that Egypt "is committed to all regional and international obligations and treaties". This has been widely interpreted as relating to the Egypt–Israel peace treaty, and has been welcomed by Israeli Prime Minister Benjamin Netanyahu.

On 7 August 2011, Field Marshal Tantawi swore in 15 new governors, 11 of whom were new to the post. Some critics complained that the new governors were appointed rather than elected, that many of them were military figures and/or members of the old regime and none of them were young, women, or Copts.

Since taking power the council has overseen the trial of 16,000 people in closed military trials, including bloggers, journalists and protesters. In May 2011, one of the members of the council, General Mamdouh Shahin, stated that the under the new constitution Egypt's military should be given `some kind of insurance ... so that it is not under the whim of a president.`

The SCAF was heavily criticized following violent confrontations in October 2011 between armed soldiers at the headquarters of the state television and radio services (known as the Maspero building). A group of protestors, mostly Coptic Christians, marched to the Maspiro building in downtown Cairo to protest against the burning of a church in Upper Egypt. A confrontation between the protestors and the army turned violent, resulting in the killing of over 20 protestors. State TV broadcast messages of Copts attacking the army and called on Egyptians to join the army. Armed men joined the army in attacking what had been a peaceful protest. The SCAF initially denied the army was responsible for any violence and further claimed that three soldiers had been killed by protestors, claiming that the soldiers were not carrying any live ammunition. Later, video evidence was broadcast showing army vehicles hitting groups of protestors. An editorial in The Washington Post blasted the SCAF for what it called a "shameful" response to the violence directed against the Coptic protestors.

Despite the turbulence of the transitional period in Egypt, polls have shown that the SCAF has enjoyed wide legitimacy from the Egyptian people and general confidence in their ability to provide free elections. A poll in October 2011 showed that 91.7% of Egyptians have confidence in the SCAF to provide the conditions for free elections. The SCAF at that time had a general approval rating of 40.6%.

On 24 January 2012, Mohamed Hussein Tantawi gave a televised speech in which he announced that the state of emergency would be partially lifted the following day. Power would be handed over to the government of the elected president in June 2012.

On 16 June 2012, just after the election of Muslim Brotherhood-affiliated Islamist candidate Mohamed Morsi as President of Egypt, the Supreme Council of the Armed Forces passed legislation which gave them control over the process of drafting a new constitution and immunity from any civilian oversight.

On 21 July 2020, the Council declared an exclusion zone between the Egyptian Border and a line drawn from the Libyan town of Sirte and the Al Jufra Airbase, promising intervention if GNA forces entered, which did so promptly leading to the Egyptian Parliament authorizing military intervention to protect the border.

Members

General Sedki Sobhy (Chairman) – Commander-in-Chief of the Egyptian Armed Forces and Minister of Defense and Military Production
Lieutenant General Mahmoud Hegazy (Deputy Chairman) – Chief of Staff of the Egyptian Armed Forces and Deputy Supreme Commander of the Egyptian Armed Forces
Admiral Osama El-Gendi – Commander-in-Chief of the Egyptian Navy
Air Marshal Younes Hamed– Commander-in-Chief of the Egyptian Air Force
Lieutenant General Abdul Meniem Al-Toras – Commander-in-Chief of the Egyptian Air Defense Forces
Major General Ismail Atman/Ahmed Abou El Dahab – Director of the Morale and Personnel Affairs Department
Major General Mohsen al-Fanagry – Assistant Defense Minister and Head of the Organization and Administration Authority
Major General Ahmed Youssef Abdel Nabi – Commander of the Border Guards Force
Major General Mohamed Saber Attia – Director of Military Operations
Major General  Naser Elaasy – General Officer Commanding, Second Field Army
Major General Mohamed Raafat Eldash – General Officer Commanding, Third Field Army – 2016
Major General Hassan al-Roueini – GOC, Central Military Zone
Major General Nabil Mohamed Fahmy – GOC, Northern Military Zone
Major General Mohsen El-Shazly – GOC, Southern Military Zone
Major General Medhat El Nahas – GOC, Western Military Zone
Major General Mamdouh Shahin – Assistant Defense Minister for Constitutional and Legal Affairs
Major General Taher Abdallah – Commander of the Armed Forces Engineering Corps
Major General Mohamed El Assar – Assistant Defense Minister for Armament Affairs
Major General Mokhtar El Molla – Assistant Defense Minister and Chief of Military Police
Major General Adel Emara – Assistant Defense Minister and Director of Military Intelligence

Dissolution
The council was dissolved right after the election of President Mohamed Morsi on 30 June 2012. The role of SCAF was transferred to the General Command of the Armed Forces.

Reactivation

In 2014, Interim President Adly Mansour issued a presidential decree reconstituting the Supreme Council of the Armed Forces (SCAF) to be headed by the defense minister and not the president for the first time in Egypt's history, Al-Ahram's Arabic News website reported on Thursday. The council's vice president is the chief of staff. The new SCAF's members are 23 top military generals from the army, navy, air force, air defence as well as the head of military intelligence. It is the first time in Egypt's history that the SCAF will not be headed by the president, who is, according to Egypt's constitution, the chief commander of the armed forces, thus giving the military greater autonomy from civil authorities. The new constitution, passed in January, includes a transitional article which gives the president the right to appoint the defence minister but also gives the SCAF the right to approve of its leader for eight years. Thus, this gives the SCAF a constitutional status, as it had operated as a statutory body since its inception. The defence minister decides which of his aides could also become council members. The president has the right to include members in the council as well as invite the council to meet whenever necessary. The president will head meetings that he calls. The defence minister invites the council for a regular meeting every three months and whenever urgently needed. In cases of a national threat or war, the council is considered in a continuous meeting.

The revised Leadership

On 3 September 2012, Colonel General Abdul Fatah al-Sisi, newly appointed Minister of Defence and Commander-in-Chief of the Armed Forces, confirmed the composition of the revised command of the Armed Forces with the blessing of newly elected President Mohamed Morsi.

Col. Gen. Sedki Sobhy (Chairman) – Commander-in-Chief of the Egyptian Armed Forces and Minister of Defense and Military Production and Supreme Commander of the Egyptian Armed Forces 
Lieutenant General Mahmoud Hegazy (Deputy Chairman) – Chief of Staff of the Egyptian Armed Forces.
Vice Admiral Osama El-Gendi – Commander-in-Chief of the Egyptian Navy
Air Vice-Marshal Younes Hamed– Commander-in-Chief of the Egyptian Air Force
Lieutenant General Abdul Meniem Al-Toras – Commander-in-Chief of the Egyptian Air Defense Forces

The commanders of Egypt's field armies:
  Major General Naser El-Aasy – Commander of the Second Field Army based in Ismailia
  Major General Mohamed Raafat Eldash – Commander of the Third Field Army based in Suez

The commanders of the main military zones:
  Central Military Zone – Major General Tawhid Tawfiq
  Northern Military Zone – Major General Gamal Shehata
  Southern Military Zone – Major General Mohamed Arafat
  Western Military Zone – Major General Mohamed Al-Masry

The remaining members of the council will consist of:
  Chief of Operations of the Armed Forces – Major General Nabil Al-Shazly
  Chief of the Engineering Authority of the Armed Forces – Major General Taher Abdullah
  Commander of the Border Guards Force – Major General Ahmed Ibrahim
  Director of the Morale Affairs Department – Major General Ahmed Abou Al-Dahab

Two of Field Marshal Hussein Tantawi's former assistants have remained in their positions and will also have seats on SCAF:
  Assistant Minister of Defence for Constitutional and Legal Affairs – Major General Mamdouh Shahin, who represents the military in the Constituent Assembly.
  Assistant Minister of Defence for Armament Affairs – Major General Mohamed Al-Assar

Over twenty officers sit on the council as of early 2015. Based on Law No. 20, however, the defense minister may invite other experts to consult with the council or attend its meetings as he sees fit. So while the official SCAF membership may consist of these individuals, the law's flexibility leaves room for other officers—active or retired—to partake in the SCAF's deliberations, signaling the potential emergence of Egypt's newest men on horseback.

See also
Egyptian Armed Forces
Emergency law in Egypt

References

External links

Egypt’s Supreme Council of the Armed Forces: Statements and Key Leaders, The New York Times
Supreme Council of the Armed Forces: "Revolutions aren't led by polite people" Qantara.de

Military of Egypt
Government of Egypt
 
Egyptian revolution of 2011
2013 Egyptian coup d'état
Organisations of the Egyptian Crisis (2011–2014)
Provisional governments
Military dictatorships
2011 establishments in Egypt